The Kerry Club Football Championship is a Gaelic football championship played between senior clubs in Kerry, south-west Ireland.

In the event of the Kerry Senior Football Championship being won by a divisional team, the winner of this competition represents Kerry in the Munster Senior Club Football Championship (as divisional teams cannot play in the provincial competition).

The competition was not played in 2006, 2007 and 2008.

Participating teams

2023 Teams

Finals listed by year

References

 2